Jan Jutte (born 1 October 1953) is a Dutch illustrator of children's literature. He received the Gouden Penseel award several times for his work.

Career 

Jutte made his debut as illustrator in 1983 with his illustrations in Annie M. G. Schmidt's book Het Beertje Pippeloentje. In the years that followed Jutte illustrated the books of various Dutch authors, including Toon Tellegen, Guus Kuijer, Edward van de Vendel, Bibi Dumon Tak, Ienne Biemans and Doeschka Meijsing. 

In 1993, he illustrated the book Lui Lei Enzo written by Rindert Kromhout. Kromhout won the Zilveren Griffel award and Jutte won the Gouden Penseel award for this book. Jutte also won the Gouden Penseel award in 2001 for his illustrations in the book Tien stoute katjes written by Mensje van Keulen and in 2004 for the book Een muts voor de maan written by Sjoerd Kuyper.

Awards 

 1994: Pluim van de maand, Liselotje op het potje
 1994: Gouden Penseel, Lui Lei Enzo (written by Rindert Kromhout)
 2001: Gouden Penseel, Tien stoute katjes (written by Mensje van Keulen)
 2002: Pluim van de maand, Ruimtereis (April 2002)
 2004: Gouden Penseel, Een muts voor de maan (written by Sjoerd Kuyper)

References

External links 
 Jan Jutte (in Dutch), Digital Library for Dutch Literature
 Jan Jutte (in Dutch), jeugdliteratuur.org

1953 births
Living people
Dutch children's book illustrators
Gouden Penseel winners
People from Arnhem
20th-century Dutch people
21st-century Dutch people